Jacobo Timerman: Prisoner Without a Name, Cell Without a Number is a 1983 American made-for-television drama film written, directed and produced by Linda Yellen. It is based on Jacobo Timerman's 1981 autobiographical book Prisoner Without a Name, Cell Without a Number. It was originally broadcast May 22, 1983 on NBC.

Cast
Roy Scheider as Jacobo Timerman
Liv Ullmann as  Mrs. Timerman 
Sam Robards as  Daniel Timerman
Zach Galligan  as Hector Timerman
Trini Alvarado  as Lisa Castello
Terry O'Quinn as Colonel Thomas Rhodes
Christopher Murney   as Colonel Rossi
Michael Pearlman   as Javier Timerman
Lee Wilkof as  Eduardo Sachon 
Joanna Merlin

References

External links

1983 films
1983 drama films
1983 television films
Drama films based on actual events
Films based on non-fiction books
American prison films
American drama television films
Films directed by Linda Yellen
Films shot in New York City
Films shot in New Jersey
Jews and Judaism in Argentina
1980s English-language films
1980s American films